The 2016 Texas Bowl was an American college football bowl game played on December 28, 2016 at NRG Stadium in Houston, Texas. Sponsored by the AdvoCare nutrition and sports performance company, it is officially known as the AdvoCare V100 Texas Bowl.  It was one of the 2016–17 bowl games concluding the 2016 FBS football season. The eleventh edition of the Texas Bowl, it featured the Kansas State Wildcats of the Big 12 Conference against the Texas A&M Aggies of the Southeastern Conference. This was the first meeting between the two teams since Texas A&M left the Big 12 Conference after the 2011 season.

Teams

Texas A&M Aggies

Kansas State Wildcats

Game summary

Box Score

Scoring summary

Statistics

References

External links
 Game summary at ESPN

Texas Bowl
Texas Bowl
Texas A&M Aggies football bowl games
Kansas State Wildcats football bowl games
Texas Bowl
Texas Bowl
Texas Bowl